Ed Steinberg is a New York City-based music video producer/director. Steinberg also founded the RockAmerica video distribution network. Steinberg has a colorful reputation. He is perhaps best known for making Madonna's first ever music video in 1982 for the song "Everybody", but has produced and directed more than 90 music videos for other artists such as Gipsy Kings, Cheap Trick, U2 and Yello. Long-form television programs he has produced include music specials for MTV, Alive From Off Center for PBS, and The Palladium, Where Mambo was King for Bravo. His videos are in collections in the Whitney Museum, The Museum of Modern Art and The Guggenheim. He has served as the musical director for the Havana Film Festival New York since 2000.

Steinberg is currently the President of RockaMedia LLC, a media production and distribution company and he is also media advisor to Kidos and www.Magicflix.com educational websites for 3– to 9-year-old children.

Music videos

References
 Ed Steinberg Videography mvdbase.com

External links
Rockamedia
RockAmerica
Retail Entertainment Design

American music video directors
Music video producers
American television producers
Music directors
Living people
Year of birth missing (living people)